was a ship for passengers and cargo built by  of Bilbao for  in 1927.
In 1936, at the beginning of the Spanish Civil War, it was requisitioned as a prison ship.

History

It was named after Cape Quilates in the Spanish protectorate in Morocco, now near Al Hoceima, Morocco.

On 25 September 1936, after the Nationalist air bombing of Bilbao, militias went to the Portu dock in Barakaldo at the Estuary of Bilbao where ships  and  held prisoners accused of siding with the Nationalists.
The militias executed on the spot many of the prisoners.
One of the dead was Fernando María de Ybarra, from the Ybarra family who had owned the ship.

Again on 2 October, Republican mariners from Spanish battleship Jaime I assaulted the prison ship.
The Biscayan authorities ordered the battleship to leave the port of Bilbao and several of the attackers were also executed.
The number of victims of both assaults varies across sources.

After a fire, it is decommissioned.

After the war, a cross was built in Barakaldo remembering the victims.
The Barakaldo authorities decided in 2020 to substitute the Franco-era cross with informational panels according to the Historical Memory Law.
The cross was destroyed in 2022 by members of the Basque leftist youth group .

References

Cargo ships of Spain
Passenger ships of Spain
Prison ships
Massacres in 1936
1936 in the Basque Country (autonomous community)
Barakaldo
Spanish Civil War massacres
Cargo ships of the Soviet Union
Ships built in Spain
1927 ships